Benon is a given name. Notable people with the given name include:

Benon Biraaro (1958–2020), Ugandan military officer
Benon Liberski (1926–1983), Polish painter and graphic artist
Benon Mugumbya (born 1980), Ugandan musician and music producer
Benon Mutambi (born 1969), Ugandan economist and civil servant